Nick Fisher or Nicholas Fisher can refer to:

 Nick Fisher (skier), Australian freestyle skier
 Nick Fisher (broadcaster), British screenwriter, journalist and TV fisherman
 Nick Fisher, travel documentary producer responsible for Indigo Traveller
 Nicholas Fisher (statistician), Australian statistician